Valley View is an unincorporated community located in Madison County, Kentucky, United States. The community is part of the Richmond–Berea Micropolitan Statistical Area. It is located at the junction of Kentucky Route 169 and Kentucky Route 1156. It is the location of the Valley View Ferry.

References

Unincorporated communities in Madison County, Kentucky
Unincorporated communities in Kentucky